The 2016–17 Cornell Big Red women's basketball team represents Cornell University during the 2016–17 NCAA Division I women's basketball season. The Big Red, led by fifteenth year head coach Dayna Smith, play their home games at Newman Arena and were members of the Ivy League. They finished the season 16–11, 7–7 in Ivy League play to finish in a tie for fourth place.

Ivy League changes
This season, the Ivy League will institute conference postseason tournaments. The tournaments will only award the Ivy League automatic bids for the NCAA Division I Men's and Women's Basketball Tournaments; the official conference championships will continue to be awarded based solely on regular-season results. The Ivy League playoff will take place March 11 and 12 at the Palestra in Philadelphia. There will be two semifinal games on the first day with the No. 1 seed playing the No. 4 seed and the No. 2 seed playing the No. 3 seed. The final will be played the next day for the NCAA bid.

Roster

Schedule

|-
!colspan=9 style="background:#B31B1B; color:#FFFFFF;"| Non-conference regular season

|-
!colspan=9 style="background:#B31B1B; color:#FFFFFF;"| Ivy League regular season

See also
 2016–17 Cornell Big Red men's basketball team

References

Cornell Big Red women's basketball seasons
Cornell
Cornell Big Red women's
Cornell Big Red women's
Cornell Big Red women's basketball